Underground hip-hop (also commonly known as indie hip-hop or underground rap) is an umbrella term for hip hop music that is outside the general commercial canon. It is typically associated with independent artists, signed to independent labels or no label at all. Underground hip hop is often characterized by socially conscious, positive, or anti-commercial lyrics. However, there is no unifying or universal theme – AllMusic suggests that it "has no sonic signifiers". "The Underground" also refers to the community of musicians, fans and others that support non-commercial, or independent music. Music scenes with strong ties to underground hip hop include alternative hip hop and conscious hip hop. Many artists who are considered "underground" today were not always so, and may have previously broken the Billboard charts.

Style
Underground hip-hop encompasses several different styles of music. Numerous acts in the book How to Rap are described as being both underground and politically or socially aware, these include – B. Dolan Brother Ali, Diabolic, Immortal Technique, Jedi Mind Tricks, Micranots, Mr. Lif, Murs, Little Brother, P.O.S and Zion I, Madlib, among others.

Underground artists with critically acclaimed albums include Atmosphere, Binary Star, Blu, Cannibal Ox, Company Flow, Del the Funky Homosapien, Roc Marciano, Freestyle Fellowship, Hieroglyphics, Juggaknots, Jurassic 5, Kool Keith, Little Brother, MF DOOM, Non Phixion, Planet Asia, RJD2, MC TP, Stryker & MFT and Ammar Kazi among many others.

Additionally, many underground hip hop artists have been applauded for the artistic and poetic use of their lyrics, such as Aesop Rock, Aceyalone, Busdriver, Cage, CunninLynguists, Dessa, OhSo Kew, Doomtree, El-P, Eyedea & Abilities, Illogic, Onry Ozzborn,  MF DOOM, Rob Sonic, billy woods, and Sage Francis, among others.

Some underground artists produce music that celebrates the fundamental elements or pillars of hip hop culture, such as Artifacts, Dilated Peoples, People Under the Stairs, and Fashawn whose music "recalls hip-hop's golden age".

Early beginnings
In Hip Hop's formative years, the vast majority of the genre was underground music, by definition. Although The Sugarhill Gang gained commercial success in 1979, most artists did not share such prominence until the mid-1980s. Ultramagnetic MCs debut album Critical Beatdown (1988) is seen as one of the earliest examples of "underground hip hop". It was described that the album was characteristic of what would later be known as "Underground Hip Hop". New York underground rapper Kool Keith received notable success with his album Dr. Octagonecologyst, gaining more attention than any contemporary independent hip hop album "in quite a while". The Stretch Armstrong and Bobbito Show was a notable underground hip hop radio show that was broadcast on WKCR, and later WQHT, in New York City from 1990 until 1999. It featured rappers such as The Notorious B.I.G., Big L, Jay-Z, and Eminem, as well as groups like Wu-Tang Clan, Mobb Deep, and Fugees, all before they gained any popularity. In 1999, Prince Paul and Breeze Brewin' created one of the first rap opera albums, named A Prince Among Thieves. Rolling Stone gave the album a 4.5/5.

In the late 1990s, progressive rap acts such as Black Star and Juggaknots helped inspire and shape the underground hip hop movement that would follow in subsequent decades.  Moving beyond the early beginning as we transition to the digital era, the implementation of online platforms in music such as SoundCloud has allowed for artists all around the world to be able to put out their tracks for their audiences, no matter how small or big to be able to listen to their work.

See also

 Alternative hip hop
 Experimental hip hop
 Christian hip hop
 Conscious hip hop 
 Drill
 Horrorcore
 Mumble rap / SoundCloud rap
 Nerdcore
 Political rap
 Progressive rap
 Rap opera

References

Further reading

External links

 
Hip hop genres
Underground culture